Leslie Howard Talbot Cliff (5 June 1908 – 2 August 1969) was a British pair skater who competed with his wife, Violet Cliff.  The couple finished seventh at the 1936 Winter Olympics.  That same year, they won the silver medal at the European Figure Skating Championships and the bronze at the World Figure Skating Championships.  They won another bronze at the 1937 World Championships.

Results
(with Cliff)

References
Leslie Cliff's profile at Sports Reference.com
Leslie Cliff's obituary

1908 births
1969 deaths
British male pair skaters
Olympic figure skaters of Great Britain
Figure skaters at the 1936 Winter Olympics
World Figure Skating Championships medalists
European Figure Skating Championships medalists
People from Naas